Duttapur  is a village in Chanditala II community development block of Srirampore subdivision in Hooghly district in the Indian state of West Bengal.

Geography
It is located in the Chanditall–II community development block under the Srirampore subdivision of the Hooghly district. Chanditala police station serves this Village.

Gram panchayat
Villages and census towns in Baksa gram panchayat are: Baksa, Duttapur, Khoragari and Madhabpur.

Demographics
As per 2011 Census of India, Duttapur had a total population of 2,285 of which 1,165 (51%) were males and 1,120 (49%) were females. Population below 6 years was 207. The total number of literates in Duttapur was 1,757 (84.55% of the population over 6 years).

Transport
The nearest railway station, Janai Road railway station, is on the Howrah-Bardhaman chord line which is a part of the Kolkata Suburban Railway system.

The main road is State Highway 15. It is the main artery of the town and it is connected to NH-19 (old number NH 2)/ Durgapur Expressway.

References 

Villages in Chanditala II CD Block